Bauta is a municipality and town located  southwest of  Havana City, in the Artemisa Province of Cuba since 2010 as a result of the division of what was the Province of Havana (Havana Countryside).

Geography
Part of the Havana metropolitan area, the municipality includes the villages of Anafe, Cangrejeras, Cayo La Rosa, Comunidad Ben Tre, Corralillo (Félix E. Alpízar), Lazo de la Vega, Machurrucutu, Playa Baracoa, Pueblo Textil (Ariguanabo), Rosa Marina and San Pedro (General Antonio Maceo). Baracoa River crosses the municipality, and Playa Baracoa is established at its mouth at the Gulf of Mexico.

Demographics 
In 2004, the municipality of Bauta had a population of 45,509.

Economy
Bauta is a regional trading center for the local farm community. Regional crops include  sugarcane, pineapple, tobacco, root vegetables, and citrus fruits. In recent years Bauta has become a haven for Cuban artists and musicians.

Transport
Bauta, crossed by the Carretera Central, is served by A4 motorway, passing some km north. From 2014, it counts a railway station on the new Havana-Guanajay-Artemisa/Mariel line, part of the Havana-Artemisa-Pinar del Río line. Playa Baracoa Airport, serving Havana, is located in the neighboring municipal territory of Caimito, but lies in front of the village of Playa Baracoa.

See also 
Municipalities of Cuba
List of cities in Cuba
Bauta Municipal Museum

References

External links

Populated places in Artemisa Province